Kolber may refer to:
Kolber (company), Swiss watchmaking company
Leo Kolber (1929–2020), Canadian businessman
Suzy Kolber (born 1964), American sportscaster
Kolbar workers in Kurdistan